Lingling District is one of two urban districts of Yongzhou City, Hunan Province, China. It is located on the south of the city proper,  and lies to the eastern border of Guangxi.

The district is bordered to the north by Dong'an County and Lengshuitan District, to the east by Qiyang County, to the south by Shuangpai County, to the west by Quanzhou County of Guangxi. Lingling District has four subdistricts, 7 towns and 3 townships under its jurisdiction, the government seat is Xujiajing.

Administrative divisions
4 subdistricts 
 Chaoyang
 Nanjindu
 Qilidian
 Xujiajing

7 towns
 Fujiaqiao
 Huangtianpu
 Lingjiaotang
 Shiyantou
 Shuikoushan
 Youtingxu
 Zhushan

3 townships
 Dangdi
 Daqingping
 Shuzipu

References
www.xzqh.org

External links 

 
County-level divisions of Hunan
Yongzhou